Fifth Element may refer to:

Elements
 Aether (classical element), the mythical fifth classical element, also known as quintessence
 Boron, the (modern) element with atomic number 5 on the periodic table

Arts and entertainment
 The Fifth Element, a 1997 film by Luc Besson starring Bruce Willis and Milla Jovovich
 The Fifth Element (video game), a 1998 video game based on the film
 The Fifth Sacred Thing, which has also been referred to as The Fifth Element, is a novel by Starhawk

Music
 The 5th Element (Tynisha Keli album), 2010
 The 5th Element (Kellee Maize album)
 Fifth Element (Pathfinder album)
 5th Element, the 1999 album by reggae and dancehall artist Bounty Killer
 "5th Element", 2005 hip-hop song by Nova Scotia rapper Classified

See also
 Five elements (disambiguation)